is the third EP by Japanese rock band Maximum the Hormone.

Track listing

Chart positions

Personnel
Daisuke – lead vocals
Maximum the Ryo – guitar, vocals
Ue-chan – bass, backing vocals
Nao – drums, vocals

References

2004 EPs
Maximum the Hormone albums
Japanese-language EPs